The 2000 Turkish census was held in 2000 and recorded the population and demographic details of every settlement in Turkey.

References 

Censuses in Turkey
2000 in Turkey
Turkey